John Clerk may refer to:

John Clerk (fl. 1414), MP for Reading
John Clerk (fl. 1419–1421), MP for Shaftesbury, perhaps also an attorney or yeoman
John Clerk (bishop) (died 1541), former bishop of Bath and Wells
John Clerk of Eldin (1728–1812), Scottish Enlightenment figure, artist, and author of An Essay on Naval Tactics
John Clerk (writer) (died 1552), English Roman Catholic writer
John Clerk, Lord Eldin (1757–1832), Scottish judge
John Clarke (physician, 1582–1653), English physician. His last name was also spelt Clerk.
John Clerk (physician) (1689–1757), Scottish physician
Clerk baronets
John Clerk of Penicuik (1611–1674), Scottish merchant
Sir John Clerk, 1st Baronet (died 1722),  Member of the Parliament of Scotland
Sir John Clerk, 2nd Baronet (1676–1755), Scottish lawyer, judge, and composer
Sir John Clerk, 5th Baronet (1736–1798), Royal Navy officer

See also
John Clerke (disambiguation)
John Clark (disambiguation)
John Clarke (disambiguation)
Clerk (disambiguation)